Echiophis is a genus of eels in the snake eel family Ophichthidae. It currently contains the following species:

 Echiophis brunneus (Castro-Aguirre & Suárez de los Cobos, 1983) (Pacific spoon-nose eel)
 Echiophis intertinctus (J. Richardson, 1848) (Spotted spoon-nose eel)
 Echiophis punctifer (Kaup, 1860) (Stippled spoon-nose eel)

References

 

Ophichthidae